Darby Brown (24 April 1929 – 31 October 1988) born Leslie Brown in Sydney was an Australian professional feather/light/welter/middleweight boxer of the 1940s and 1950s who won the Australian welterweight title, and British Empire welterweight title, his professional fighting weight varied from , i.e. featherweight to , i.e. middleweight. Darby Brown was managed by Jack Hourigan, and trained by Ray Horne, and Bob Urquhart.
Darby Brown was inducted into the Australian National Boxing Hall of Fame in 2015 in the Veterans category.

Professional boxing record

References

External links

Image - Darby Brown

1929 births
1988 deaths
Boxers from Sydney
Featherweight boxers
Lightweight boxers
Middleweight boxers
Place of death missing
Welterweight boxers
Australian male boxers
Commonwealth Boxing Council champions